Old Beach is a residential / rural locality in the local government area (LGA) of Brighton in the Hobart LGA region of Tasmania. The 2016 census recorded a population of 3779 for the state suburb of Old Beach.

It is approximately 7 km from the Baskerville Raceway. Old Beach is surrounded by an abundance of green mountainous terrain. At the heart of Old Beach is an old mining quarry, active in the late 1980s for the mining of sandstone, and providing and economic boost for the area.

History
Old Beach was gazetted as a locality in 1970.
Old Beach Post Office opened on 11 January 1866 and closed in 1975.

Geography
The River Derwent forms the western and south-western boundaries.

Road infrastructure
Route B32 (East Derwent Highway) runs through from west to south.

References

Localities of Brighton Council (Tasmania)